Hittite cuneiform is the implementation of cuneiform script used in writing the Hittite language. The surviving corpus of Hittite texts is preserved in cuneiform on clay tablets dating to the 2nd millennium BC (roughly spanning the 17th to 12th centuries BC).

Hittite orthography was directly adapted from Old Babylonian cuneiform. What is presented below is Old Akkadian cuneiform, so most of the characters shown here are not, in fact, those used in Hittite texts. For examples of actual Hittite cuneiform, see The Hittite Grammar Homepage or other similarly reputable sources. The Hethitisches Zeichenlexikon ("Hittite Sign List" commonly referred to as HZL) of Rüster and Neu lists 375 cuneiform signs used in Hittite documents (11 of them only appearing in Hurrian and Hattic glosses), compared to some 600 signs in use in Old Assyrian. About half of the signs have syllabic values, the remaining are used as ideograms or logograms to represent the entire word—much as the characters "$", "%" and "&" are used in contemporary English.

Cuneiform signs can be employed in three functions: syllabograms, Akkadograms or Sumerograms. Syllabograms are characters that represent a syllable. Akkadograms and Sumerograms are ideograms originally from the earlier Akkadian or Sumerian orthography respectively, but not intended to be pronounced as in the original language; Sumerograms are mostly ideograms and determiners. Conventionally,
Syllabograms are transcribed in italic lowercase
Akkadograms in italic uppercase
Sumerograms in regular uppercase.
Thus, the sign GI  can be used (and transcribed) in three ways, as the Hittite syllable gi (also ge); in the Akkadian spelling QÈ-RU-UB of the preposition "near" as QÈ, and as the Sumerian ideogram GI for "tube" also in superscript, GI, when used as a determiner.

Syllabary
The syllabary consists of single vowels, vowels preceded by a consonant (conventionally represented by the letters CV), vowels followed by a consonant (VC), or consonants in both locations (CVC). This system distinguishes the following consonants (notably dropping the Akkadian s series),
b, p, d, t, g, k, ḫ, r, l, m, n, š, z,
combined with the vowels a, e, i, u. Additional ya (=I.A ), wa (=PI ) and wi (=wi5=GEŠTIN  "wine") signs are introduced. The contrast of the Assyrian voiced/unvoiced series (k/g, p/b, t/d) is not used to express the voiced/unvoiced contrast in Hittite; they are used somewhat interchangeably in some words, while other words are spelled consistently. The contrast in these cases is not entirely clear, and several interpretations of the underlying phonology have been proposed.

Similarly, the purpose of inserting an additional vowel between syllabograms (often referred to as "plene writing" of vowels) is not clear. Examples of this practice include the -a- in iš-ḫa-a-aš "master" or in la-a-man "name", ú-i-da-a-ar "waters". In some cases, it may indicate an inherited long vowel (lāman, cognate to Latin nōmen; widār, cognate to Greek  hudōr), but it may also have other functions connected with 'word accentuation'.

V

CV

VC

CVC
Ḫ: ḫal  ; ḫab/p  ; ḫaš ; ḫad/t  (=pa, PA "sceptre"); ḫul (=ḪUL "evil"); ḫub/p ; ḫar/ḫur  (ḪAR "ring", ḪUR "thick", MUR "lung")
K/G: gal  (=GAL "great"); kal, gal9 ; kam/gám  (=TU7 "soup"); k/gán  (=GN "field"); kab/p, gáb/p  (=KAB "left"); kar (=KAR "find"); k/gàr ; k/gaš  (=bi, KAŠ "beer"); k/gad/t  (=GAD "linen"); gaz  (=GAZ "kill"); kib/p ; k/gir ; kiš  (=KIŠ "world"); kid/t9  (=gad); kal  (=KAL "strong"); kul  (=KUL "offspring"); kúl, gul  (=GUL "break"); k/gum ; kur  (=KUR "land"); kr/gur 
L: lal  (=LAL "bind"); lam ; lig/k  (=ur); liš  (=LIŠ "spoon"); luḫ  (=LUḪ "minister"); lum 
M: maḫ  (=MAḪ "great"); man (=MAN "20"); mar ; maš  (=MAŠ "half"); meš (="90") ; mil/mel  (=iš); miš  ; mur  (=ḫur); mut (=MUD "blood")
N: nam  (=NAM "district"); nab/p ; nir ; niš (=man)
P/B: p/bal ; pár/bar  (=maš); paš ; pád/t,píd/t ; p/bíl  (=GIBIL "new"); pir ; p/biš,pš   (=gir); p/bur 
R: rad/t ; riš  (=šag)
Š: šaḫ  (=ŠUBUR "pig"); šag/k  (=SAG "head"); šal  (=MUNUS "woman"); šam  (=ú); šàm ; šab/p ; šar  (=SAR "plant"); šìp ; šir  (=ŠIR "testicles"); šum ; šur 
T/D: t/daḫ, túḫ ; tág/k,dag/k ; t/dal  (=ri); tám/dam  (=DAM "wife"); t/dan  (=kal); tab/p,dáb/p  (=TAB "2") ; tar ; t/dáš,t/diš  ("1") ; tàš ; tin/tén ; t/dim  ; dir (=DIR "red") ; tir/ter  (=TIR "forest") ; tíš  ; túl ; t/dum ; t/dub/p  (=DUB "clay tablet") ; túr/dur  (=DUR "strip")
Z: zul ; zum

Determiners
Determiners are Sumerograms that are not pronounced but indicate the class or nature of a noun for clarity, e.g. in URUḪa-at-tu-ša; the URU is a determiner marking the name of a city, and the pronunciation is simply /hattusa/. Sumerograms proper on the other hand are ideograms intended to be pronounced in Hittite.

m, I ("1", DIŠ) , male personal names
DIDLI  (suffixed), plural or collective
DIDLI ḪI.A  (suffixed), plural
DINGIR (D)  "deity"
DUG  "vessel"
  "house"
GAD  "linen, cloth"
GI  "tube; reed"
GIŠ  "wood"
GUD  "bovid" 
ḪI.A (suffixed), plural
ḪUR.SAG  "mountain"
ÍD  "river"
IM  "clay" 
ITU  "month"
KAM  (suffixed), numerals
KI  (suffixed), in 0.6% of toponyms
KU6  "fish"
KUR  "land"
KUŠ  "hide, fur"
LÚ  "man"
MEŠ  (suffixed), plural
MEŠ ḪI.A  (suffixed), plural
MUL  "star"
MUNUS (f)  "woman", female personal name
MUŠ  "serpent"
MUŠEN  (suffixed) "bird"
NA4  "stone"
NINDA  "bread"
PÚ  "source"
SAR   (suffixed) "plant"
SI  "horn"
SÍG  "wool"
TU7  "soup"
TÚG  "garment"
Ú  "plant"
URU  "city"
URUDU  "copper"
UZU  "meat"

References

E. Forrer, Die Keilschrift von Boghazköi, Leipzig (1922)
J. Friedrich, Hethitisches Keilschrift-Lesebuch, Heidelberg (1960)
Chr. Rüster, E. Neu, Hethitisches Zeichenlexikon (HZL), Wiesbaden (1989)
Gillian R. Hart, Some Observations on Plene-Writing in Hittite,  Bulletin of the School of Oriental and African Studies, University of London (1980)
Gordin, Shai. Hittite Scribal Circles: Scholarly Tradition and Writing Habits, Wiesbaden: Harrassowitz (2015)

External links
FreeIdgSerif includes Unicode cuneiform for Hittite (GFDL, branched off FreeSerif)
Omniglot, Hittite Includes correct Hittite syllabary
 

Cuneiform
Cuneiform